Ouvrage Lembach is a petit ouvrage of the Maginot Line.  Lembach is adjoined by petit ouvrage Grand Hohekirkel at some distance to its west and gros ouvrage Four-à-Chaux immediately to its east. It faces the German frontier, and was part of the Fortified Sector of the Vosges. During the Battle of France in 1940, the German 215th Infantry Division broke through the line of smaller fortifications to the west of Lembach, but did not directly attack. After aerial bombardments, Lembach surrendered with the rest of the Maginot fortifications according to the terms of the Second Armistice at Compiègne. After the war Lembach was renovated for further use, but was abandoned by the 1970s.

Design and construction 
The site was surveyed by CORF (Commission d'Organisation des Régions Fortifiées), the Maginot Line's design and construction agency; Lembach was approved for construction in July 1931. The petit ouvrage was to be expanded in a second phase of construction, planned but not carried out, envisioned the addition of an 81mm mortar turret and new, separate munitions and personnel entries.

Description 
Lembach comprises an entry block, two infantry blocks and one observation block. A small entry block exists near Block 1, with underground barracks and service areas along the gallery that links the combat blocks.
Block 1: Infantry block with two GFM cloches, one twin machine gun cloche and one machine gun (JM)/47mm anti-tank gun embrasure (JM/AC47).
Block 2: Infantry block with two GFM cloches, one twin machine gun cloche and one machine gun (JM)/47mm anti-tank gun embrasure (JM/AC47).
Block 3: Infantry block with one GFM cloche, two twin machine gun cloches and one observation colche (VDP).
Entry: Entry block with two automatic rifle embrasures.

Casemates and shelters 
A series of detached casemates and infantry shelters are in the vicinity of Lembach, including

 Casemate de Lembach: Casemate in close proximity to Lembach's entrance, but not connected. Single block with one JM/AC47 embrasure, one twin machine gun embrasure  and a GFM cloche.

Additionally, the space between Lembach and Grand-Hohékirkel, its neighbor to the west, is filled by more than forty casemates and blockhouses along the river Schwartzbach and across the ridge to the Sauer river.

Manning 
The 1940 manning of the ouvrage under the command of Captain Drouin comprised 58 men and 4 officers of the 165th Fortress Infantry Regiment. The units were under the umbrella of the 5th Army. The nearby Casernement de Lembach provided peacetime above-ground barracks and support services to Lembach and other positions in the area.

History 

See Fortified Sector of the Vosges for a broader discussion of the Vosges sector of the Maginot Line.

1940 
On 19 June 1940, the German 215th Infantry Division attacked in the area immediately to the west of Lembach, between the river Schwartzbach and Lembach. Later in the day, Lembach and other ouvrages were bombed by Stukas with no significant effect.  The next day an attack was repelled with artillery support from Hochwald. The German advance continued into the Vosges region, but did not directly attack Lembach. Lembach, Four-à-Chaux and Hochwald formally surrendered on 1 July 1940.

1944-1945 
Lembach saw little action during the Lorraine Campaign, where most action took place around Hochwald and Schoenenbourg.

Cold War 
In  the 1950s interest in  the Maginot Line was renewed. In 1951, Lembach, Four-à-Chaux, Hochwald and Schoenenbourg were designated the Môle de Haguenau, a point of resistance against a potential invasion by forces of the Warsaw Pact. Lembach was repaired and put in a state of readiness in 1951-52. By the late 1950s interest in fixed fortifications was waning after  France developed a nuclear deterrent.  The money needed to maintain and upgrade the fortifications was diverted for the nuclear programs. Lembach was not manned or maintained after the early 1970s

Present condition 
Lembach is privately owned and reported to be in poor condition.

See also 
 List of all works on Maginot Line
 Siegfried Line
 Atlantic Wall
 Czechoslovak border fortifications

Notes

References

Bibliography 
Allcorn, William. The Maginot Line 1928-45. Oxford: Osprey Publishing, 2003. 
Allcorn, William. The Maginot Line 1928-45. Oxford: Osprey Publishing, 2003. 
Kaufmann, J.E. and Kaufmann, H.W. Fortress France: The Maginot Line and French Defenses in World War II, Stackpole Books, 2006. 
Kaufmann, J.E., Kaufmann, H.W., Jancovič-Potočnik, A. and Lang, P. The Maginot Line: History and Guide, Pen and Sword, 2011. 
Mary, Jean-Yves; Hohnadel, Alain; Sicard, Jacques. Hommes et Ouvrages de la Ligne Maginot, Tome 1. Paris, Histoire & Collections, 2001.  
Mary, Jean-Yves; Hohnadel, Alain; Sicard, Jacques. Hommes et Ouvrages de la Ligne Maginot, Tome 2. Paris, Histoire & Collections, 2003.  
Mary, Jean-Yves; Hohnadel, Alain; Sicard, Jacques. Hommes et Ouvrages de la Ligne Maginot, Tome 3. Paris, Histoire & Collections, 2003.  
Mary, Jean-Yves; Hohnadel, Alain; Sicard, Jacques. Hommes et Ouvrages de la Ligne Maginot, Tome 5. Paris, Histoire & Collections, 2009.

External links
 L'ouvrage de Lembach at alsacemaginot.com 
 Petit ouvrage de Lembach at lignemaginot.com 
 Lembach (petit ouvrage de) at fortiff.be 

Maginot Line
LEMB
LEMB